Inger-Lise Lien (born 1954) is a Norwegian social anthropologist. She is a Research Professor at the Norwegian Centre for Violence and Traumatic Stress Studies. She is an expert on genital mutilation, criminal gangs, illegal drug trade, racism, migration and social integration of immigrants, and Pakistan.

Lien obtained a dr.polit. (PhD) degree in social anthropology with a dissertation on moral and emotions in Punjab, Pakistan in 1993.

Books
 Pathways to Gang Involvement and Drug Distribution, Springer, 2013
 I bakvendtland: Kriminelle liv, Universitetsforlaget, 2011
 Street Gangs, Migration and Ethnicity, Willan Publishing, 2008
 Moral og emosjoner i pakistansk Punjab, 1993

References

External links

1954 births
Living people
Norwegian anthropologists
Norwegian Centre for Violence and Traumatic Stress Studies people
University of Oslo alumni
21st-century women scientists
Social anthropologists
Norwegian women anthropologists